Racine stages are a categorization of epileptic seizures proposed by Ronald J. Racine in 1972.  Prior to Racine's research in epilepsy, a quantifiable means to describe seizure intensities and their causes was not readily available.  Racine's work allowed for epilepsy to be understood on a level previously thought impossible.

Introduction
In the brain, electrical signals are spread by the firing of neurons which lead to a desired outcome in the body. This can be caused by a release of a neurotransmitter or the voluntary contractions of a muscle. An action potential must be met in order for the electrical signal to be created. In epileptic patients, electrical signals reach a threshold, causing a spread of firing neurons in the brain. This causes multiple signals to spread through the nervous system resulting in a seizure. Once a seizure has occurred, damage can be seen in the area that the action potential came from. For example, if the initial action potential came from the hippocampus, damage can be seen in the surrounding neurons.
While an EEG is able to determine the presence of a seizure and the intensity of the action potentials, the overall result on the body is hard to determine. In 1972, Ronald J. Racine developed a method to split the severity of seizures into stages: mouth and facial movement, head nodding, forelimb clonus, rearing with forelimb clonus, and rearing and falling with forelimb clonus. Racine stages can be used to determine at which stages the patient is experiencing a seizure and at what level of stimulus the patient is able to reach a certain stage. Over time, mapping of the stimulus level and the resulting seizure intensity can show damage to the stimulated area. Mappings for patients can be made by sending electrical signals at different strengths to measure the body's reaction. Once the epileptic patient experiences a seizure, the patient becomes more susceptible to having further seizures. Racine stages were developed using an animal model to outline the five stages. Once developed, the Racine stages served as a quantitative way to categorize the intensity of a seizure that an epileptic patient experiences.

Development

A seizure is described as large amounts of synchronized action potentials which cause the body to perform uncontrollable muscle contractions resulting in involuntary movement and an incapacity to control ones actions. This synchronized action potential must surpass a certain threshold, which is different for each patient, which then reverberates throughout the body. For  patients with epilepsy, seizure occurs constantly and continue to grow in intensity. When a patient has epilepsy, they are always at risk of experiencing a seizure. However, for each patient, different environmental stimuli can cause the patient to experience a seizure. For each patient, the treatment method and the success of that treatment method is different. 
Henry Molaison (HM) is known for his contribution to memory studies in neuroscience. Before he lost his ability to retain long-term memories, he had debilitating seizures. HM, showed small signs of seizures while growing up. Before the age of fifteen HM's only sign of a seizure was a lull in the conversation. For a few seconds he would appear as if he was daydreaming. Some described him as absent minded for a few seconds. His first traumatic seizure happened while he was fifteen. While in the family car, HM experienced a seizure that caused his entire body to convulse. In 1969, A deep brain stimulation experiment was developed to test the fluctuations of thresholds for patients with epilepsy. In this experiment, researchers used implanted electrodes to measure the electrographic activity during the introduction of a stimulus and the resulting seizure. While this experiment was successful in showing that seizure happened at lower thresholds after repeated treatments, the overall severity of each seizure was not well recorded.

Rat model
Prior to Racine's research into epilepsy, a model for the severity of a seizure was not known.
In 1972, Ronald J. Racine sought to develop a model that quantified the severity of a seizure. Using animal testing (rat model), Racine was able to stimulate specific parts of the brain using slight electrical impulses. He used methods of deep brain stimulation in order to ensure the targeted areas of the brain were able to reach the specific threshold to see a reaction in the rats. Rats were separated into categories of the target area, duration of stimuli, and overall intensity of stimuli. He specifically targeted the hippocampus and the amygdala of the test animals. Each rat in the model was anesthetized and special probes were placed into specific parts of the brain according to the target area.  Using an electrical stimulation at one second intervals and different intensities, Racine observed a change in muscle stimulation in the rats.  Once excited, the rats would demonstrate signs of a seizure.  Racine was able to categorize the bodies' reaction to the stimuli into five different categories . He also observed that with the continuation of treatment, it was easier for the seizure to take place. These stages of increasing severity can serve as a way to quantify a seizure.

Classical stages

As the intensity of the seizure increases, the severity efferent actions increase. Each stage is a result of the action potentials causing the muscle to contract and relax resulting in an involuntary, observable action.

Racine stages
 Mouth and facial movement
 Sometimes hard to determine, this can also be observed in human patients by a period in time when the patient experiences absentmindedness or becomes still.
 Head nodding
 Uncontrollable muscle contractions in the neck cause slight to severe jarring of the head. 
 Forelimb clonus
 Involuntary movement of the arms due to increased muscle stimulation.
 Rearing with forelimb clonus
 Broadening of the chest. For rat models, rearing can be demonstrated by the rat standing on its hind legs.
 Rearing and falling with forelimb clonus (generalized motor convulsions)
 During this final stage, the patient is at the highest risk for injury. Risk of injury due to falling, or situational circumstances may threaten the life of the patient and those around them.

As the level of stimulus increases, the resulting involuntary movement goes down the level of stages. Levels further down the Racine stages also contain symptoms of the previous stages. For example, a person who is demonstrating the actions of a stage four seizure may also demonstrate head nodding (indicative of a level two seizure). It is known that repeated exposure to a stimuli lowers the overall threshold for a seizure.)   The first two stages have been seen two to four days before an increase in the severity of the seizure is seen. This can be recorded by the patient experiencing reactive behavior seen higher on the Racine scale. This is seen is 80% of patients with seizures.

Clinical uses 
Since its development, the use of the Racine stages has helped further the research into treating epileptic patients. Currently, Racine stages are being used in rat models. The Racine models are still used in laboratory settings to demonstrate the severity of seizures. While this model serves as the standard for a method to quantify the severity  of a seizure, additional stages have been added to model the more severe cases. In 1978, Pinel and Rovne developed a model that added to the traditional five stages.  While these stages are based on the classic five stages, the increase in severity called for 5 additional stages.

Pinel and Rovne additional stages
 Multiple stage five seizures
 Mostly two level five seizures with additional seizures possible.
 Jumping
 Running
 Jumping and running
 Two different seizures with a partial seizure in-between
 Two seizures which are higher than the Racine stages
 Separated by a lower level seizure
Stages 6–10 also include the addition of symptoms seen in stages one to five.

Research into the cure for epilepsy is ongoing. Different levels of tolerance to outside stimulus exist for each patient. Some patients experience seizures with audio or visual stimulation. However, some patients are more sensitive to environmental factors than others. In most cases treatment from medication or surgery can help limit the prevalence of seizures. However, these treatment methods do not always cure the patient.

Additional adaptations
The classic five Racine stages have been adapted many times since their designation in 1972. Depending on the changes in stimuli intensity and duration, researches add or take away levels according to the reactions of the rat models. While adaptations do exist to the Racine stages model, the original model has served as the backbone to the idea of creating a method for determining the intensity of a seizure. The use of the Racine stages can help further research into new solutions in epileptic treatment.

Resources 

Epilepsy
Articles containing video clips